Phoebe javanica is a species of plant in the family Lauraceae. It is a tree endemic to Java in Indonesia. It is threatened by habitat loss.

References

javanica
Endemic flora of Java